The Battle of Vijaya (Vietnamese language: trận Đồ Bàn) between Đại Việt and the kingdom of Champa was a siege of Vijaya, the Cham capital, in 1377. The Vietnamese forces were defeated and the Đại Việt emperor, Trần Duệ Tông, died as a result of the battle.

Aftermath

The death of Trần Duệ Tông was a turning point for Trần dynasty and Đại Việt. Po Binasuor attacked from the north, and successfully captured the Đại Việt capital of Thăng Long.

Notes

References

History of Champa
History of Vietnam